The Bihuroazu Kamanaa Mosque or the Bihuroazu Kamanaa Miskiy is one of the oldest mosques in Malé. According to historical documents, the Bihuroazu Mosque was built before Sultan Muhammad Thakurufaanu was established as the king of Maldives. The mosque was built by Bihuroazu Fashan akalo. The mosque was named Bihuroazu Fashana kalo Mosque.

The word  comes from the Persian language, meaning "prosperous". 

One of the most important reasons why the mosque has been historical place is the resting place of as-Sultan al-Ghaazee Muhammad Thakurufaanu al-Auzam and his younger brother, Al-Ghaazee Hassan Rannabandeyri Kilefaanu was buried in the Mausoleum of as-Sultan Muhammad Thakurufaanu al-Auzam.

Praying Outside of the Mosque is Prohibited

In 2017 April, 20th, Prayers have been banned on the premises of the Bihuroazu Kamanaa mosque due to seeing a grave outside of the mosque. A large number of people pray outside of the mosque. Howerver, Prayers are not prohibited inside the mosque. This is an grave of Dhanthaelu Ali.

Destruction of the Mosque

During the regime of Abdulla Yameen, A 12-storey multipurpose buildings have been allocated in 2018's budget for the demolition of the Bihuroazu Mosque in Male' City. The opposition has criticized for destroying Bihuroazu Mosque. Speaking on a programme on Channel 13, the Minister said that this was a false statement made by the opposition to mislead the people. However, A media official at the Ministry of Islamic Affairs said that the Bihuroazu Mosque was closed to clean the mosque, and allow a large number of people to pray at the mosque due to the prayers have been banned outside of the mosque due to graves being there.

Reference

Mosques in Malé